Rai Rashid Ahmed Khan was born in Edinburgh on 30 March 1970. He was a member of National Assembly of Pakistan and spoke at United Nations on serious issues pertaining to the Arab Peninsula.

He is a barrister and Queen’s Counsel with more than 25 years of professional experience as an international criminal law and human rights lawyer.

Khan holds a Bachelor of Laws degree with Honours from King’s College, University of London, as well as a Ph.D in International and Comparative Law from University of Oxford.

Since 2017 he has been serving as President of the International Criminal Court Bar Association (ICCBA) at The Hague.

References

Year of birth missing (living people)
Living people
Members of the National Assembly of Pakistan